Joshua McGrath (born December 27, 1985) is a Canadian retired ice dancer. With former partner Siobhan Karam, he is the 2005 Canadian junior national champion. They placed seventh at the 2005 World Junior Figure Skating Championships and competed on both the Junior Grand Prix and the senior ISU Grand Prix of Figure Skating circuits. They were teamed up in 1997 by Marina Zoueva and their partnership ended in 2007 when McGrath retired from skating.

References

International skating union
 

Canadian male ice dancers
Living people
1985 births
Sportspeople from Ottawa
21st-century Canadian people